Hugo Inglis (born 18 January 1991) is a New Zealand field hockey player who plays as a forward for the New Zealand national team.

He played for the Southern Dogs in the New Zealand Hockey League and he played in Europe for SCHC, Braxgata and currently Rotterdam. He also represented the Uttar Pradesh Wizards in the Hockey India League.

Club career
Inglis started playing hockey when he was five and he joined his local hockey club the Southern Dogs. In 2012 he signed a two-year contract at SCHC in the Netherlands. Due to his commitments to the national team, he would miss the preparation for the second half of the season so in January 2013 his contract at SCHC was annulled and he returned to New Zealand. In 2014 he joined Rotterdam where he played for one season. He returned to Europe in 2016 to play for Braxgata in Belgium. After three seasons with Braxgata, he returned to Rotterdam.

International career
Inglis made his international team debut in 2009.  At the 2012 Summer Olympics, he competed for the national team in the men's tournament. At the 2014 Commonwealth Games, he was one of the New Zealand players who scored in the penalty shoot-out to decide the bronze medal, but New Zealand still lost the match to England.  He is one of three players from Dunedin to attend the 2016 Summer Olympics in Rio de Janeiro, where the men's team came seventh.  In 2018, Inglis was part of the New Zealand team who won silver at the Commonwealth Games.

References

External links

1991 births
Living people
New Zealand male field hockey players
Olympic field hockey players of New Zealand
Male field hockey forwards
Field hockey players at the 2012 Summer Olympics
Field hockey players at the 2016 Summer Olympics
Field hockey players at the 2020 Summer Olympics
2010 Men's Hockey World Cup players
2014 Men's Hockey World Cup players
2018 Men's Hockey World Cup players
Commonwealth Games medallists in field hockey
Commonwealth Games bronze medallists for New Zealand
Field hockey players at the 2010 Commonwealth Games
Field hockey players at the 2014 Commonwealth Games
Sportspeople from Dunedin
Field hockey players at the 2018 Commonwealth Games
Field hockey players at the 2022 Commonwealth Games
Commonwealth Games silver medallists for New Zealand
Uttar Pradesh Wizards players
Hockey India League players
SCHC players
HC Rotterdam players
Men's Hoofdklasse Hockey players
Men's Belgian Hockey League players
New Zealand expatriate sportspeople in Germany
Medallists at the 2010 Commonwealth Games
Medallists at the 2018 Commonwealth Games